Pierre-Antoine Cousteau (18 March 1906 – 17 December 1958) was a French polemicist and journalist. He was the brother of the explorer Jacques-Yves Cousteau.

Leftist activism
He was born in Saint-André-de-Cubzac, Gironde, and educated in the United States as well as the Lycée Louis-le-Grand. Cousteau served in the military before working as a translator and a meteorologist and for New York City's Credit Alliance Corporation. He became a journalist for left-wing papers such as Regards or Monde and was associated with pacifism and the Anti-Stalinist left.

Move to Fascism
Cousteau abandoned his communism in the early 1930s, and was drawn to antisemitism and democracy, writing for Coup de Patte and then Je suis partout, becoming editor of the journal in 1932. In this role, he was close to Pierre Gaxotte, who converted him to fascism.

He visited Nazi Germany in 1936 with Robert Brasillach and Georges Blond and then Spain in 1938 with Brasillach and Maurice Bardèche. While the trips developed his fascist sympathies, his attendance at the Nuremberg Rally of 1937 left him with the opinion that Nazism was impressive but not without its flaws.

Collaboration
Cousteau was recalled up to the army in 1939 and captured in 1940, although Brasillach secured his release and he returned to Je suis partout, eventually succeeding Brasillach as political director in 1943. A strong believer in collaboration, he sought internment for the Jews and justified his stance by stating in 1943 that "We are not opportunists. We remain just plain fascists". His other wartime roles included a spell as editor of Paris-Soir in 1941, service on the general secretariat of Milice from 1942 and a series of written works for journals such as Combats, the militant journal of Henry Charbonneau. He was particularly known for both his antisemitism and his anti-Americanism. In 1942, he produced the work L'Amérique juive in which he sought to demonstrate the United States was controlled by Jews who were bent on controlling the world.

In August 1944, he moved to Bad Mergentheim, where he helped run a French newspaper and radio station, before ultimately fleeing to Switzerland. Arrested at Innsbruck, he was condemned to death in November 1946, before the sentence was commuted to life with hard labour. Cousteau would later justify his collaboration by stating: "I wanted a German victory because it represented the last chance of the white man, while the democracies represented the end of the white man".

Post-war activity
Released under an amnesty in 1953, he became editor of the extreme nationalist journal Rivarol, as well as contributing to Henry Coston's Lectures Françaises, Jeune Nation, Charivari, Dimanche-Matin and others. He was also associated with the minor Union des Intellectuels Indépendants movement. His brother Jacques, whose international profile was growing at the time, had begged Pierre-Antoine to retire from public life following his release from prison, but he refused, insisting that it was a matter of honor that he continue to agitate. In his post-war work Les lois de l'hospitalité he argued in favor of collaboration: "we [the collaborators] did not commit an error of judgement. There were just too many tanks and too many planes against us".

He fell seriously ill in the late 1950s and had to withdraw from politics, requiring regular blood transfusions to survive. He died age 52 in Paris.

Publications

Bibliography

References

External links
 

1906 births
1958 deaths
People from Gironde
20th-century French writers
French communists
French fascists
French meteorologists
Pierre-Antoine
French anti-communists
French male writers
French military personnel of World War II
French prisoners of war in World War II
World War II prisoners of war held by Germany
French collaborators with Nazi Germany
Antisemitism in France
20th-century French journalists